Shiv Ram is a 1991 Hindi-language action film, produced by Jai Sharma under the Tanushree Films banner and directed by Jagdish A. Sharma. It stars Jeetendra, Aditya Pancholi, Javed Jaffrey, Sangeeta Bijlani, Ekta Sohini  and music composed by Rajesh Roshan.

Plot
Inspector Shiv is a lionhearted cop who dedicated his life to the department. He lives cheerfully, with his wife Sangeeta, and younger brother Ram. Once, a guileful treacherous criminal Babu Rao Bheja under the veil absconds prisoners from jail which creates turmoil in the country. Shiv intellectually apprehends him with the support of a squealer Javed. Afterward, he encounters a perilous don Sangram Singh / Sanga and seizes his lieutenant Khaka. In the prison, Khaka is acquainted with Babu Rao Bheja, they flee and fuse with Sanga. Now, they complot to kill Shiv and extort Javed by showing endanger to his son. Hence, he is compelled and, in the attack, Shiv is severely injured but survives. Tragically, Javed also backstabbed and loses his son. Soon after the recovery, Shiv rejoins when he is left speechless to receive the termination. Since he is sick to death a piece of bullet remained very near to his brain. Anyhow, he tries to hide but discovering it Ram pleads to accomplish his task and joins the Police force. In tandem, Sangeeta also overhears it but quiets. Despite this, the savages re-attack in which Sangeeta dies. Then, Shiv flares up with vengeance and decides to eliminate knaves before his death. Thus, he starts his murder spree with the support of Javed. Knowing it, Ram challenges to catch him but crossing many hurdles Shiv triumphs in which Javed also dies. Finally, the movie ends with Shiv leaving his breath on Ram's lap.

Cast
Jeetendra as Inspector Shiv
Aditya Pancholi as Inspector Ram
Javed Jaffrey as Javed
Sangeeta Bijlani as Sangeeta
Ekta Sohini as Manisha
Sadashiv Amrapurkar as Babu Rao Bheja
Kiran Kumar as Sangram Singh / Sanga
Mahendra Verma as Kaka
Javed Khan

Soundtrack

References

1990s Hindi-language films
Films scored by Rajesh Roshan